How Do I Look is a 2006 American documentary directed by Wolfgang Busch. The film chronicles ball culture in Harlem and Philadelphia over a ten-year period.

Overview
Wolfgang Busch began interviewing subjects from the ball circuit in the mid-1990s and continued filming for a decade. How Do I Look documents the ball culture, which began in the 1920s during the Harlem Renaissance, and has since influenced mainstream artists and musicians. The film follows several ball "legends" such as Willi Ninja, Kevin UltraOmni, Octavia St. Laurent, Pepper LaBeija and Jose Xtravaganza. Many of the subjects that are featured in How Do I Look were also featured in the 1990 documentary Paris Is Burning.

How Do I Look also explores the prejudices members of the ball culture face due to their sexuality and race. In a 2005 New York Times article, choreographer Willi Ninja commented about the mainstream society's readiness to embrace facets of ball culture while also rejecting the Ball "children" due to their sexuality:

... "If Madonna does voguing, it's O.K.," he added. "But when the ball children dance, even now, people say, 'Oh, it's a bunch of crazy queens throwing themselves on the floor.'"

Other subjects speak about their attempts to forge careers in mainstream society and the effect that HIV and AIDS has had on ball culture as many of the subjects featured died of AIDS during or shortly after filming was complete.

Reception

Box office

As an independent film production, How Do I Look did not receive financing or distribution from the commercial film industry. The filmmakers arranged independent screenings and distribution world-wide. As a result, the film was not made widely available in commercial movie theatres or art-houses upon its release in June 2006 during Gay Pride month. The documentary's earnings have principally come from the sale of DVD's and, more recently, from online streaming sites. Over the years, however, How Do I Look has earned commercial success by word of mouth recommendations, its numerous appearances in film festivals, and from its goodstanding relationship with the Ball community.

Critical response

Prior to its release in 2006, early screenings of How Do I Look garnered prominent media mentions in the Village Voice, the New York Post, and the New York Times. Early on, How Do I Look was noted as an "awareness program," alluding to the film's noble aspects to empower members of the Ballroom community. The media attention also focused on the African-American and Latino gay subculture, who were known to go to lengths to keep their homosexuality "under wraps," a situation referred to as being on the down low. Often, the film's numerous screenings in academic settings were reported.

In the years following its release, How Do I Look has repeatedly been the subject of reports in the foreign press, including in the French public radio channel, France Inter. The documentary was noted for its goal of empowering the LGBTQ Ballroom community, in particular following the AIDS pandemic, as was reported in Italian Vogue. In Spanish Vanity Fair, the documentary was noted for having given new life to the vogue (dance) artistic impression, in particular by having added social, racial, and political conscience to the Ballroom community.

Accolades

Because How Do I Look was produced by and for the Ballroom community, it has been praised for having the coöperation of the Ball community in its production and for being faithful to its subject matter. The documentary has been named to several must-watch lists by the LGBTQ media. Them, the LGBTQ publication owned by Conde Naste, short-listed How Do I Look in its review of Ballroom history. Out magazine listed How Do I Look amongst six films about the Ballrooms and voguing. Mainstream culture publications, like W magazine, have also short-listed How Do I Look as a must-see "pride" film for LGBTQ audiences.

The revealing interviews documented in How Do I Look have been lauded, in retrospect, for having been ahead of their time. In a review of "Transgender Sex Work and Society," which has been described as the definitive book about transgender sex work, a transgender star of How Do I Look was noted for her frank talk about transgender sex work.

Controversies

How Do I Look began filming in the wake of accusations that the filmmaker behind Paris Is Burning had exploited members of the Ballroom community during the making of that film. The accused exploitation was the inspiration for How Do I Look, said co-assistant director Kevin Omni. In the years since How Do I Look was released, the documentary has been mentioned by many as providing balance to and/or a follow-up or sequel of Paris Is Burning. Two of the co-assistant directors of the film were members of the Ballroom community, Kevin Omni and Luna Khan. In the media, Omni has also noted that the film aimed to create "possibilities" for members of the Ballroom community.

Production notes
How Do I Look was filmed in New York City and Philadelphia. It premiered at the NewFest Film Festival in New York City in June 2006.  The assistant directors were Kevin Burrus and Luna Khan.

Home media
How Do I Look was released on Region 1 DVD in the United States.

References

External links
 
 

2006 films
2006 in LGBT history
2006 documentary films
American documentary films
LGBT African-American culture
American independent films
Documentary films about HIV/AIDS
Documentary films about ball culture
Films about fashion
Films shot in New York City
2006 LGBT-related films
Documentary films about dance
2000s English-language films
HIV/AIDS in American films
2000s American films